"Life Without Principle" is an essay by Henry David Thoreau that offers his program for a righteous livelihood. It was published in 1863.

Overview 
In his essay, Thoreau questions whether working is the most important part of one's life, arguing that work is often at odds with poetry and living. He notes that, when he saw his neighbor in the early morning leading a team of oxen, he at first felt guilty because he was watching from the comfort of his home. However, later he saw the result of the laborer's work--a bit of useless yard art, and his opinion changed. He argues that work ought to be worthwhile and he insists that he has no need for the "police of meaningless labor" to tell him how to spend his time.

"All great enterprises are self supporting. The poet, for instance, must sustain his body by his poetry, as the boiler in the wood-cutting mill is fed with the shavings it creates. You must get your living by loving." In his own occasional work as a surveyor, he noticed that, when presented with different methods of surveying a piece of land, the owner would ask which method would give the owner the most land rather than which was the most accurate way to do it. 

He talks of the constant motion of work and business and how people value making money above all else. Overall, the essay provides a cogent overview of Thoreau's philosophy of work and life.

Composition and publication history
On October 18th 1855, Thoreau was invited to participate in a series of lectures on reform at the Railroad Hall in Providence, Rhode Island. With little time to prepare, he searched his journals for inspiration. He found a passage he had written on September 7th, 1851: "I do not so much wish to know how to economize time as how to spent it, by what means to grow rich, that the day may not have been in vain." After some re-working, the end result was a lecture delivered on December 6th, 1855, which he titled "What Shall It Profit?". The title, before it was altered to "Life Without Principle", referenced a verse in the Gospel of Mark, 8:36. Thoreau later revised his notes and delivered the lecture under the title "Life Misspent".

Thoreau prepared "Life Without Principle" for publication during the final months of his life based on his journal notes between 1851 and 1855 that originally inspired his lecture. It was published posthumously in 1863. In addition to "Life Without Principle", Thoreau was either writing or re-working several other lectures and essays for publication in the final months of his life, including "Walking", "Wild Apples", and "Autumnal Tints".

Analysis 
Thoreau intended the original title, "What Shall It Profit?", as a Biblical reference ("For what shall it profit a man, if he shall gain the whole world, and lose his own soul?"). A few lines earlier, Mark 8:33, Jesus turns to Peter and says, "Get thee behind me, Satan; for thou savorest not the things that be of God, but the things that be of man." Thoreau originally alluded to this line as well in the earlier version of his lecture, referencing the California Gold Rush: "Satan, from one of his elevations, showed mankind the kingdom of California, and instead of the cry 'Get thee behind me, Satan,' they shouted, 'Go ahead!' and he had to exert himself to get there first".

Scholar Barbara Packer contends that Thoreau's shifting titles show his shifting pity and contempt for his contemporaries who he felt were employed in ways that degraded life or the country.

Notes

External links 

 Life Without Principle at The Picket Line.
 Life Without Principle (Illustrated & Annotated) at Tumblr.
 

Essays by Henry David Thoreau